Alexander (Shura) Pavlovich Chekalin (25 March 1925 – 6 November 1941) was a Russian teenager, Soviet partisan, and Hero of the Soviet Union.

Chekalin was captured, tortured, and hanged for partisan activities in Tula Oblast near Moscow during the German-Soviet War.

Biography

Sixteen-year-old Shura Chekalin engaged in underground resistance activities in the region of Tula near Moscow. In the first days of November 1941, he took part in an ambush of German vehicles, destroying one vehicle with a hand-grenade. After becoming ill, Chekalin was bedridden, and his location was betrayed to the Germans by an unknown informant. When Germans approached to arrest him, he threw a hand grenade at them, but it failed to explode. He was brutally tortured, and hanged on 6 November 1941. His body was left hanging for twenty days, taken down only after the area had been retaken by the Red Army.

He was posthumously made a Hero of the Soviet Union on 4 February 1942. The town of Chekalin was renamed for him in 1944.

References

External links
 War Hero Alexander Chekalin

1925 births
1941 deaths
Soviet military personnel killed in World War II
Heroes of the Soviet Union
Resistance members killed by Nazi Germany
Russian torture victims
Soviet partisans
Child soldiers in World War II
Russian children
Soviet children
People executed by Nazi Germany by hanging
Executed Soviet people from Russia